Gilles Cocquempot (born 22 October 1952 in Éperlecques) is a member of the National Assembly of France.  He represented the Pas-de-Calais department,  as a member of the Socialiste, radical, citoyen et divers gauche.

References

1952 births
Living people
People from Pas-de-Calais
Politicians from Hauts-de-France
Socialist Party (France) politicians
Deputies of the 11th National Assembly of the French Fifth Republic
Deputies of the 12th National Assembly of the French Fifth Republic
Deputies of the 13th National Assembly of the French Fifth Republic